Mor Serigne Diop (born 29 September 1988) is a French footballer.

Career
Diop was born in Paris, France. He played in the Ukraine for FC Metalurh Donetsk, spent the 2006–07 season on loan to FC Stal Alchevsk and Belgian side K.F.C. Germinal Beerschot. In August 2008 he moved to Cyprus and Apollon Limassol before playing on loan for PAEEK FC. He then played for Spanish side SE Eivissa-Ibiza. On 22 October 2009, Diop was one of four new players brought to Darlington by new manager Steve Staunton. Diop was signed on a short term contract, although he needed international clearance to officially complete his signing and picked up a slight muscle injury ruling him out of that weekend's league trip to Barnet. He scored his first goal for Darlington in a 3-1 FA Cup defeat at Barnet on 7 November 2009. He was one of several players released early from their Darlington contracts towards the end of the 2009–10 season.

On 29 October 2015, Diop signed for Bedford Town FC, teaming up with former Hereford United manager Jon Taylor.
 
He signed for Rushall Olympic F.C. in 2016.

Honours
PAEEK FC
 Cypriot Third Division: 2007–08

References

External links

 
Serigne Diop at Aylesbury United

1988 births
Living people
Association football forwards
French footballers
French expatriate footballers
Footballers from Paris
Beerschot A.C. players
Gloucester City A.F.C. players
FC Stal Alchevsk players
FC Metalurh Donetsk players
FC Arsenal Kyiv players
Apollon Limassol FC players
PAEEK players
Darlington F.C. players
Cypriot Second Division players
Expatriate footballers in Ukraine
French expatriate sportspeople in Ukraine
Expatriate footballers in Cyprus
Expatriate footballers in Spain
Expatriate footballers in England
Expatriate footballers in Belgium
Ukrainian Premier League players
English Football League players
Rushall Olympic F.C. players
Redditch United F.C. players
Bedford Town F.C. players
Sutton Coldfield Town F.C. players
Hereford United F.C. players
UJA Maccabi Paris Métropole players